Frederic Melvin Wheelock (September 19, 1902 – October 29, 1987) was an American Latin professor, best known for his authorship of Wheelock's Latin.

Early life 
He was the son of Franklin M. and Etta R. (née Goldthwaite) Wheelock. He graduated cum laude from Harvard University in 1925 and later received both M.A. and Ph.D. degrees from Harvard University.

Career 
He taught at Haverford College, Harvard University, the City College of New York, Brooklyn College, Cazenovia Junior College (where he served as dean), the Darrow School for Boys, the University of Toledo (from which he retired in 1968, being a full professor), and Florida Presbyterian College (where he served as visiting professor). Wheelock was a member of the American Classical League, American Philological Association and the Classical Association of the Atlantic States.

Personal life 
On August 14, 1937, he married Dororthy Elizabeth Rathbone (1909–1990), daughter of James Colburn Rathbone (1881–1983) and Lillian Ford Reynolds (maiden; 1883 – ). His two children are Martha Ellen Wheelock and Deborah Wheelock Taylor, who continued his legacy as teachers. His grandchildren are Vanessa Taylor Sands and Ian Taylor. Ralph Wheelock (1600–1683) was Frederic's paternal 7th great-grandfather.

Books 
Wheelock wrote a number of papers and reviews in the areas of textual criticism, paleography, and Latin studies. Some of his works include:

Wheelock's Latin
Wheelock's Latin Reader, previously titled Latin Literature: A Book of Readings
Introduction and annotations of Quintilian as Educator (translated by H. E. Butler)

Biographies of Wheelock written by Ward Briggs appear in the book A Biographical Dictionary of American Classicists (Westport, CT: Greenwood Press, 1994) and in The Classical Outlook (winter 2003 issue).

References

External links 
Biography of Frederic Melvin Wheelock provided by Wheelockslatin.com
 

1902 births
1987 deaths
Harvard University alumni
Haverford College faculty
Harvard University faculty
City College of New York faculty
Cazenovia College faculty
University of Toledo faculty
American textbook writers
Brooklyn College faculty
Eckerd College faculty
American Latinists
20th-century American non-fiction writers
20th-century American male writers
Ralph Wheelock family
American male non-fiction writers